An oxidizing agent (also known as an oxidant, oxidizer, electron recipient, or electron acceptor) is a substance in a redox chemical reaction that gains or "accepts"/"receives" an electron from a  (called the , , or ). In other words, an oxidizer is any substance that oxidizes another substance. The oxidation state, which describes the degree of loss of electrons, of the oxidizer decreases while that of the reductant increases; this is expressed by saying that oxidizers "undergo reduction" and "are reduced" while reducers "undergo oxidation" and "are oxidized".
Common oxidizing agents are oxygen, hydrogen peroxide and the halogens.

In one sense, an oxidizing agent is a chemical species that undergoes a chemical reaction in which it gains one or more electrons. In that sense, it is one component in an oxidation–reduction (redox) reaction. In the second sense, an oxidizing agent is a chemical species that transfers electronegative atoms, usually oxygen, to a substrate. Combustion, many explosives, and organic redox reactions involve atom-transfer reactions.

Electron acceptors

Electron acceptors participate in electron-transfer reactions. In this context, the oxidizing agent is called an electron acceptor and the reducing agent is called an electron donor. A classic oxidizing agent is the ferrocenium ion , which accepts an electron to form Fe(C5H5)2.  One of the strongest acceptors commercially available is "Magic blue", the radical cation derived from N(C6H4-4-Br)3.

Extensive tabulations of ranking the electron accepting properties of various reagents (redox potentials) are available, see Standard electrode potential (data page).

Atom-transfer reagents
In more common usage, an oxidizing agent transfers oxygen atoms to a substrate. In this context, the oxidizing agent can be called an oxygenation reagent or oxygen-atom transfer (OAT) agent. Examples include  (permanganate),  (chromate), OsO4 (osmium tetroxide), and especially  (perchlorate). Notice that these species are all oxides.

Common oxidizing agents
Oxygen (O2)
Ozone (O3)
Hydrogen peroxide (H2O2) and other inorganic peroxides, Fenton's reagent
Fluorine (F2), chlorine (Cl2), and other halogens
Nitric acid (HNO3) and nitrate compounds such as potassium nitrate (KNO3), the oxidizer in black powder
Potassium chlorate (KClO3) 
Sulfuric acid (H2SO4)
Peroxydisulfuric acid (H2S2O8)
Peroxymonosulfuric acid (H2SO5)
Hypochlorite, chlorite, chlorate, perchlorate, and other analogous halogen compounds like household bleach (NaClO)
Hexavalent chromium compounds such as chromic and dichromic acids and chromium trioxide, pyridinium chlorochromate (PCC), and chromate/dichromate compounds such as Sodium dichromate (Na2Cr2O7)
Permanganate compounds such as potassium permanganate (KMnO4)
Sodium perborate (·)
Nitrous oxide (N2O), Nitrogen dioxide/Dinitrogen tetroxide (NO2 / N2O4)
Sodium bismuthate (NaBiO3)
Cerium (IV) compounds such as ceric ammonium nitrate and ceric sulfate
Lead dioxide (PbO2)

Dangerous materials definition 

The dangerous goods definition of an oxidizing agent is a substance that can cause or contribute to the combustion of other material. By this definition some materials that are classified as oxidizing agents by analytical chemists are not classified as oxidizing agents in a dangerous materials sense. An example is potassium dichromate, which does not pass the dangerous goods test of an oxidizing agent.

The U.S. Department of Transportation defines oxidizing agents specifically. There are two definitions for oxidizing agents governed under DOT regulations. These two are Class 5; Division 5.1(a)1 and Class 5; Division 5.1(a)2. Division 5.1 "means a material that may, generally by yielding oxygen, cause or enhance the combustion of other materials." Division 5.(a)1 of the DOT code applies to solid oxidizers "if, when tested in accordance with the UN Manual of Tests and Criteria (IBR, see § 171.7 of this subchapter), its mean burning time is less than or equal to the burning time of a 3:7 potassium bromate/cellulose mixture." 5.1(a)2 of the DOT code applies to liquid oxidizers "if, when tested in accordance with the UN Manual of Tests and Criteria, it spontaneously ignites or its mean time for a pressure rise from 690 kPa to 2070 kPa gauge is less than the time of a 1:1 nitric acid (65 percent)/cellulose mixture."

Common oxidizing agents and their products

See also

References

Chemical properties
Electrochemistry
 
Redox